Albert L. Tonkinson (birth registered first  1936) was an English former professional rugby league footballer who played in the 1950s and 1960s. He played at club level for Castleford (Heritage No. 420) and Bradford Northern. He also suffered from type 2 diabetes and was a member of the queen's guard.

Background
Albert Tonkinson's birth was registered in Pontefract district, West Riding of Yorkshire, England.

References

External links
Search for "Tonkinson" at rugbyleagueproject.org
Albert Tonkinson Memory Box Search at archive.castigersheritage.com

1936 births
Living people
Bradford Bulls players
Castleford Tigers players
English rugby league players
Rugby league players from Pontefract